Pelenosomus is a genus of minute seed weevils in the beetle family Curculionidae. There is at least one described species in Pelenosomus, P. cristatus.

References

Further reading

 
 
 

Curculionidae
Articles created by Qbugbot